Rick Chavez Zbur (born March 2, 1957 in New Mexico) is an American attorney currently serving in the California State Assembly. 

He is also a former United States House of Representatives candidate. He is a well-known LGBT civil rights advocate and is active in the environmental movement. Zbur is also notable as the first openly gay non-incumbent U.S. congressional primary candidate to win an election.

Personal life
Zbur grew up on a farm in the Rio Grande Valley of rural New Mexico with his mother, Erlinda Chavez Zbur. He currently lives in Los Angeles.

Career

Zbur practiced environmental law for about three decades before retiring in 2014. In 1996, Zbur ran for the United States House of Representatives in California's 38th congressional district. Zbur has also been a chair of the California League of Conservation Voters board of directors from 2011 to 2017.  Since 2014, Zbur has led Equality California, the largest LGBT civil rights organization in California.

Activism

LGBT rights
Zbur identifies as gay and has been a vocal leader in the LGBT civil rights movement for nearly four decades. In 2014, Zbur became the executive director of Equality California, the largest LGBT civil rights organization in California.

HIV/AIDS
In the early 1980s, Zbur campaigned to fight against HIV/AIDS. He also helped found the Children Affected by AIDS Foundation. In 1992, together with the LGBT community in Los Angeles, Zbur organized fundraisers for Bill Clinton, then Governor of Arkansas, and Barbara Boxer, then a Congresswoman who was running for the U.S. Senate  Both were elected.

Environmental movement
As an environmental lawyer, Zbur has been active in the environmental movement in California. He served as president of the California League of Conservation Voters from 2011 to 2017.

Political campaigns

1996 U.S. House of Representatives run 

In 1996, Zbur ran for the United States House of Representatives in California's 38th congressional district against Republican incumbent Steve Horn. He became the first openly gay non-incumbent congressional primary candidate to win an election when he won the Democratic primary election on March 26, 1996.

During his congressional campaign, Zbur's key legislative priorities included environmental protection, Social Security, and Medicare.

2022 Los Angeles City Attorney run announcement 
In April 2020, Zbur announced that he would be running for Los Angeles City Attorney.

California State Assembly (2022–present)

Election 
In 2021, Zbur announced a run for the California State in Assembly District 51, a newly drawn district which includes Hollywood, Beverly Hills, Westwood Village, and Santa Monica. He won the primary and then the general election in 2022.

References

External links
Equality California profile

1957 births
20th-century American politicians
American environmentalists
Hispanic and Latino American state legislators in California
California lawyers
American environmental lawyers
Democratic Party members of the California State Assembly
Equality Federation
HIV/AIDS activists
LGBT people from New Mexico
American LGBT rights activists
Living people
Yale University alumni
Harvard Law School alumni
LGBT state legislators in California